The following highways are numbered 284:

Japan
 Japan National Route 284

United States
 Interstate 284 (former)
 Arkansas Highway 284
 California State Route 284
 Florida State Road 284 (former)
 Georgia State Route 284
 K-284 (Kansas highway)
 Kentucky Route 284
 Maryland Route 284
 Minnesota State Highway 284
 Montana Secondary Highway 284
 New Jersey Route 284
 New York State Route 284
 Ohio State Route 284
 Pennsylvania Route 284
 South Carolina Route 284
 Tennessee State Route 284
 Texas State Highway 284 (former)
 Texas State Highway Loop 284
 Farm to Market Road 284 (Texas)
 Utah State Route 284